Tamecka Michelle Dixon (born December 14, 1975) is an American professional basketball player. She announced her retirement prior to the 2010 WNBA season.

High school
Dixon attended Linden High School in Linden, New Jersey, where she was named a High School All-American by the WBCA. She participated in the WBCA  High School All-America Game in 1993, scoring ten points.

College
At the University of Kansas, Dixon averaged 14.2 points, 4.5 rebounds, 2.8 assists, and 1.8 steals in 119 career games. She was named Big 12 Player of the Year and was also named to the 1996–97 Kodak All-American Team.

Kansas statistics

USA Basketball
In 2002, Dixon was named to the national team which competed in the World Championships in Zhangjiagang, Changzhou and Nanjing, China. The team was coached by Van Chancellor. Dixon scored 3.4 points per game. The USA team won all nine games, including a close title game against Russia, which was a one-point game late in the game.

WNBA career
Dixon was selected in the first round of the 1997 WNBA Draft (14th overall) by the Los Angeles Sparks. Dixon was one of the 4 remaining players from the first season of the WNBA before retiring. She won two championship rings, each coming from wins with the Sparks (2001 and 2002).

She last played for the Indiana Fever before retiring.

Career statistics

Regular season

|-
| style="text-align:left;"|1997
| style="text-align:left;"|Los Angeles
| 27 || 21 || 26.5 || .456 || .423 || .773 || 3.0 || 2.0 || 1.8 || 0.2 || 2.1 || 11.9
|-
| style="text-align:left;"|1998
| style="text-align:left;"|Los Angeles
| 22 || 22 || 32.3 || .438 || .356 || .779 || 2.5 || 2.5 || 1.1 || 0.4 || 2.6 || 16.2
|-
| style="text-align:left;"|1999
| style="text-align:left;"|Los Angeles
| 32 || 14 || 17.6 || .387 || .313 || .738 || 2.1 || 1.7 || 0.5 || 0.1 || 1.2 || 6.8
|-
| style="text-align:left;"|2000
| style="text-align:left;"|Los Angeles
| 31 || 31 || 28.5 || .454 || .353 || .805 || 3.4 || 3.1 || 1.3 || 0.3 || 1.9 || 10.9
|-
| style="text-align:left;"|2001
| style="text-align:left;"|Los Angeles
| 29 || 29 || 31.9 || .417 || .176 || .791 || 2.9 || 3.9 || 0.9 || 0.1 || 2.5 || 11.7
|-
| style="text-align:left;"|2002
| style="text-align:left;"|Los Angeles
| 30 || 30 || 31.9 || .391 || .351 || .831 || 3.1 || 4.0 || 0.9 || 0.2 || 2.7 || 10.6
|-
| style="text-align:left;"|2003
| style="text-align:left;"|Los Angeles
| 30 || 30 || 34.7 || .437 || .212 || .883 || 4.2 || 3.0 || 1.2 || 0.3 || 2.3 || 13.7
|-
| style="text-align:left;"|2004
| style="text-align:left;"|Los Angeles
| 32 || 21 || 28.5 || .442 || .455 || .782 || 3.4 || 3.5 || 1.1 || 0.0 || 2.2 || 9.7
|-
| style="text-align:left;"|2005
| style="text-align:left;"|Los Angeles
| 30 || 23 || 20.2 || .409 || .000 || .850 || 2.2 || 2.6 || 0.8 || 0.1 || 1.3 || 5.3
|-
| style="text-align:left;"|2006
| style="text-align:left;"|Houston
| 21 || 14 || 25.7 || .404 || .111 || .821 || 2.6 || 2.3 || 0.6 || 0.1 || 2.5 || 7.0
|-
| style="text-align:left;"|2007
| style="text-align:left;"|Houston
| 18 || 0 || 27.2 || .439 || .294 || .861 || 3.2 || 3.2 || 1.3 || 0.3 || 2.1 || 12.0
|-
| style="text-align:left;"|2008
| style="text-align:left;"|Houston
| 24 || 20 || 26.4 || .403 || .154 || .857 || 3.2 || 1.8 || 1.0 || 0.1 || 2.0 || 9.0
|-
| style="text-align:left;"|2009
| style="text-align:left;"|Indiana
| 32 || 1 || 13.3 || .410 || .400 || .857 || 1.6 || 1.2 || 0.4 || 0.1 || 0.8 || 4.1
|-
| style="text-align:left;"|Career
| style="text-align:left;"|13 years, 3 teams
| 360 || 256 || 26.3 || .424 || .309 || .809 || 2.9 || 2.7 || 1.0 || 0.1 || 2.0 || 9.7

Playoffs

|-
| style="text-align:left;"|1999
| style="text-align:left;"|Los Angeles
| 4 || 0 || 10.5 || .350 || .000 || 1.000 || 2.0 || 1.3 || 0.8 || 0.0 || 1.3 || 3.8
|-
| style="text-align:left;"|2000
| style="text-align:left;"|Los Angeles
| 4 || 4 || 31.8 || .370 || .500 || .889 || 2.8 || 4.0 || 0.8 || 0.0 || 2.0 || 11.8
|-
| style="text-align:left;"|2001
| style="text-align:left;"|Los Angeles
| 7 || 7 || 36.1 || .482 || .462 || .818 || 2.4 || 4.1 || 1.3 || 0.3 || 2.9 || 13.6
|-
| style="text-align:left;"|2002
| style="text-align:left;"|Los Angeles
| 5 || 4 || 29.4 || .568 || .500 || .900 || 4.0 || 3.4 || 2.4 || 0.0 || 2.6 || 12.2
|-
| style="text-align:left;"|2003
| style="text-align:left;"|Los Angeles
| 9 || 9 || 35.1 || .426 || .333 || .963 || 3.2 || 3.2 || 1.6 || 0.2 || 1.2 || 12.2
|-
| style="text-align:left;"|2004
| style="text-align:left;"|Los Angeles
| 3 || 3 || 33.3 || .400 || .000 || .875 || 5.7 || 3.0 || 0.7 || 0.0 || 3.3 || 10.3
|-
| style="text-align:left;"|2005
| style="text-align:left;"|Los Angeles
| 2 || 1 || 6.0 || .500 || .000 || .000 || 0.5 || 1.0 || 0.5 || 0.0 || 0.5 || 1.0
|-
| style="text-align:left;"|2006
| style="text-align:left;"|Houston
| 2 || 0 || 22.0 || .364 || .000 || .750 || 4.0 || 2.5 || 0.0 || 0.0 || 2.0 || 5.5
|-
| style="text-align:left;"|2009
| style="text-align:left;"|Indiana
| 10 || 0 || 6.2 || .346 || .000 || .600 || 0.7 || 0.2 || 0.1 || 0.0 || 0.5 || 2.1
|-
| style="text-align:left;"|Career
| style="text-align:left;"|9 years, 3 teams
| 46 || 28 || 24.0 || .435 || .405 || .880 || 2.6 || 2.5 || 1.0 || 0.1 || 1.7 || 8.5

Notes

1975 births
Living people
All-American college women's basketball players
American expatriate basketball people in Italy
American women's basketball players
Basketball players from New Jersey
Houston Comets players
Indiana Fever players
Kansas Jayhawks women's basketball players
LGBT basketball players
LGBT people from New Jersey
Lesbian sportswomen
Linden High School (New Jersey) alumni
Los Angeles Sparks draft picks
Los Angeles Sparks players
Parade High School All-Americans (girls' basketball)
People from Linden, New Jersey
Shooting guards
Sportspeople from Union County, New Jersey
Women's National Basketball Association All-Stars
United States women's national basketball team players